Pollenfeld is a municipality  in the district of Eichstätt in Bavaria in Germany.

Division of Pollenfeld
Districts: Pollenfeld with Wörmersdorf, Seuversholz with Ziegelhütte, Sornhüll with Götzelshard, Wachenzell with Ziegelhütte, Weigersdorf and Preith.

Geography
Pollenfeld lies in the Ingolstadt region, 8 km (approx. 5 miles) north of the district seat (Kreisstadt) of Eichstätt in the Franconian Jura mountains.

History

Pollenfeld had long been part the Prince-Bishopric of Eichstätt. The place has been a part of Bavaria since the Peace of Pressburg in 1805. In 1818, through the Bavarian Municipality Edict ("Bayerische Gemeindeedikt"), the municipality of Pollenfeld was created. The incorporation of the municipalities of Seuversholz, Sornhüll, Wachenzell, Weigersdorf (all of the foregoing in 1972) and in part, also, in 1978, of Preith, followed thereafter in connection with district or regional reform in Bavaria.

References

Eichstätt (district)